USS Marcus Island (CVE-77) was the twenty-third of fifty s built for the United States Navy during World War II. She was named after an engagement on 31 August 1943 over Minami-Tori-shima, known on American maps as Marcus Island. She was launched in December 1943, commissioned in January 1944, and she served in the Mariana and Palau Islands campaign, the Philippines campaign, as well as the Battle of Okinawa. She spent the majority of her World War II as a flagship for various escort carrier formations, serving as the headquarters for Rear Admiral William D. Sample and Felix Stump. During the Philippines campaign, she participated in the Battle off Samar, the largest naval engagement in history, and during the Battle of Mindoro, she had multiple near-brushes with Japanese kamikazes. Post-war, she participated in Operation Magic Carpet, repatriating U.S. servicemen from throughout the Pacific. She was decommissioned in December 1946, being mothballed in the Atlantic Reserve Fleet. Ultimately, she was broken up in 1960.

Design and description

Marcus Island was a Casablanca-class escort carrier, the most numerous type of aircraft carrier ever built, and was designed specifically to be rapidly mass-produced using prefabricated sections, in order to replace heavy early war losses. She was powered with two Skinner Unaflow reciprocating steam engines, which drove two shafts, providing , thus enabling her to make . Her compact size limited the length of the flight deck and necessitated the installment of an aircraft catapult at her bow, and there were two aircraft elevators to facilitate movement of aircraft between the flight and hangar deck: one each fore and aft.

One /38 caliber dual-purpose gun was mounted on the stern. Anti-aircraft defense was provided by eight Bofors  anti-aircraft guns in single mounts, as well as twelve Oerlikon  cannons, which were mounted around the perimeter of the deck. By the end of the war, Casablanca-class carriers had been modified to carry thirty  cannons, and the number of Bofors  guns had been doubled to sixteen, by putting them into twin mounts. These modifications were in response to increasing casualties due to kamikaze attacks. Although Casablanca-class escort carriers were designed to function with a crew of 860 and an embarked squadron of 50 to 56, the exigencies of wartime often necessitated the inflation of the crew count. Casablanca-class escort carriers were designed to carry 27 aircraft, but the hangar deck could accommodate more. During the Mariana and Palau Islands campaign, Marcus Island carried 16 FM-2 Wildcat fighters and 12 TBM-1C Avenger torpedo bombers for a total of 28 aircraft. At the beginning of the Philippines campaign, she carried 17 FM-2 Wildcats and 12 TBM-1C Avengers for a total of 29 aircraft. During the Battle of Mindoro, she carried 24 FM-2 Wildcats and 9 TBM-1C Avengers for a total of 33 aircraft. This increase in fighter capabilities was due to the threat of kamikaze attacks. During the Invasion of Lingayen Gulf, she carried 26 FM-2 Wildcats and 9 TBM-1C Avengers for a total of 35 aircraft. By the Battle of Okinawa, she carried 20 FM-2 Wildcats, 11 TBM-3 Avengers, and a TBM-3P photo-reconnaissance plane for a total of 32 aircraft.

Construction

Her construction was awarded to Kaiser Shipbuilding Company, Vancouver, Washington, under a Maritime Commission contract, on 18 June 1942. She was laid down on 15 September 1943 under the name Kanalku Bay, under Frank Knox's directive naming escort carriers for "sounds, bays, and islands". She was laid down as MC hull 1114, the twenty-third of a series of fifty Casablanca-class escort carriers. On 6 November 1943, she was renamed to Marcus Island as part of a modified convention that set escort carriers to be named after "sounds, bays, and islands, and famous American battles". She was launched on 16 December 1943; sponsored by Mrs. S.L. LaHache; transferred to the Navy and commissioned at Astoria, Oregon on 26 January 1944, with Captain Charles F. Greber in command.

Service history

World War II

Upon being commissioned, Marcus Island underwent a shakedown cruise down the West Coast. Upon its completion, she began transporting aircraft from the West Coast to bases in the South Pacific, with her first ferry mission starting on 19 May. Finishing her transport run on 1 July, she embarked Composite Squadron (VC) 21, and departed westwards from San Diego on 20 July.

Marianas and Palau Islands campaign
She arrived in Tulagi of the Solomon Islands on 24 August, where she  joined Task Group 32.7, the Western Escort Carrier Group. As Task Unit 32.7.1's flagship, Rear Admiral William D. Sample raised his flag over Marcus Island. Her task group was assigned to provide close air support for the marines participating in the planned landings on Peleliu and Angaur of the Palau Islands, as a part of the larger Mariana and Palau Islands campaign.

Marcus Island commenced pre-invasion strikes on 12 September, softening up Japanese positions on Peleliu and Angaur. Marcus Island began close air support operations on 15 September, the day of the landings. On the first day of the landings, her aircraft contingent lost an Avenger along with its pilot in combat, although losses were generally light for the rest of the battle. She continued providing air cover and launching strikes until 2 October, when she retired to Manus of the Admiralty Islands, arriving on 4 October.

Philippines campaign

Battle of Leyte

At Manus, Marcus Island joined Task Group 77.4, the escort carrier group tasked with supporting the return to the Philippines as part of the Seventh Fleet. She maintained her status as a flagship for Task Unit 77.4.2, also known as "Taffy 2". She, accompanied by eighteen other escort carriers and their screens of battleships, cruisers, and destroyers, steamed on 12 October for Leyte Gulf, where they were expected to support the landings on Leyte. "Taffy 2" was positioned to the direct south of "Taffy 3", which was positioned to the east of the San Bernardino Strait. Arriving off the island on 18 October, her aircraft began carrying out naval patrols and strikes against predesignated targets. Once the Sixth Army had landed on 20 October, her aircraft transitioned towards a focus on close air support, supporting the initial advances for the next few days. On that day, Rear Admiral Sample insisted on accompanying one of Marcus Islands Avengers as it conducted a close air support mission, and was wounded by shrapnel when the aircraft had a shell penetrate and explode within its fuselage. During the initial landings, the Marcus Islands air contingent flew 261 sorties over Leyte.

Battle off Samar

On 23 October, the Battle of Leyte Gulf began. The majority of the Japanese naval fleet had been concentrated in an attempt to repel the Americans from the Philippines, the seizure of which would have cut the vital oil supply lines from Southeast Asia. Vice Admiral William Halsey Jr., commander of the Third Fleet, detached his surface ships to engage the diversionary Northern Force.

With "Taffy 3" helplessly overmatched, the entirety of Taffy 2's aircraft was recalled to join the defense. Marcus Island only had a single Avenger available, as the rest had been sent to airdrop supplies to the 96th Division. By the time these Avengers returned, the battle had already concluded. Her fighters strafed and bombed the advancing Japanese ships, recording fourteen hits and shooting down five Japanese planes. Marcus Island was also obliged to refuel and rearm seven Avengers originating from "Taffy 3" which had been diverted.

While the American forces had been distracted with the Battle off Samar and its immediate aftermath, Vice Admiral Naomasa Sakonju's six ship transport unit was in the process of unloading 2,000 troops onto Ormoc Bay, on the Western coast of Leyte.  After unloading the troops in the morning of 26 October it was sighted while attempting to retire westwards. A strike group of twenty-three Avengers and twenty-nine fighters was assembled to strike the Japanese ships. Marcus Island contributed twelve of its aircraft to the strike group, and the strike group reached the Japanese ships at 10:00 in the morning, sinking one and crippling another, which later sank.

Battle of Mindoro

On the morning of 30 October, Marcus Island and three of her sister ships withdrew from Leyte towards Manus, having been reorganized into Task Unit 77.4.4, still maintaining her status as flagship. Throughout the month of November, she provided air cover for convoys traveling near the eastern Philippines, which had been harassed by Japanese planes based on Mindanao. In late November, Marcus Island left Seeadler Harbor for Kossol of the Palau Islands. On 10 December, Marcus Island steamed for Mindoro as a flagship for Task Unit 77.12.7, providing air screening for the Mindoro attack group.

On 15 December, during the morning of the Mindoro landings, Marcus Island and her sisters came under intense kamikaze attack. At around 4:30, about 40 Japanese aircraft, divided approximately in half between kamikazes and escorts, began taking off from Clark Field and Davao to engage Task Group 77.12. At 8:00, TG 77.12 began turning back towards Leyte, having been relieved of their duties covering the landing forces by Army Air Forces aircraft, but the Japanese kamikazes pursued closely.

One Zero crossed over the carrier towards her starboard quarter, whilst the other one made a steep bank to remain at her port. As it entered the water, its bomb detonated, spraying shrapnel across the flight deck and injuring six of her crew. A few minutes later, a Yokosuka D4Y dive bomber attempted to make a run against Marcus Island, but it missed with its bomb and was shot down. Marcus Island was able to continue her air support operations on Mindoro.

Invasion of Lingayen Gulf
Marcus Island retired from operations off of Mindoro on 16 December, returning to the Admiralty Islands on 23 December. There, she joined Task Unit 77.4.4, the San Fabian Protective Group as its flagship, which was assigned to participate in the Invasion of Lingayen Gulf, assisting the Sixth Army as it landed on Luzon. Task Unit 77.4.4 was responsible for providing air screening for Task Force 78, the San Fabian Task Force, commanded by Vice Admiral Daniel E. Barbey. During the night of 4–5 January 1945, as TF 78 passed through the Surigao Strait, it encountered two Japanese midget submarines. As one of the midget submarines raised its periscope to look around, a plane from Marcus Island dropped a depth charge onto it, leaving it dead in the water and with a severe list. It was finished off by an escorting destroyer, which rammed it.

Marcus Island arrived in Lingayen Gulf on 6 January, where she provided an air screen to fend off kamikazes. On the morning of 8 January, her morning patrol of fighters a group of Japanese planes, shooting down four. Nonetheless, a kamikaze damaged . On 10 January, Kadashan Bay was ordered to transfer her entire stock of aircraft to Marcus Island and withdraw. During time period, Marcus Island averaged to a launching or landing every 3.8 minutes of operations, setting a record for an escort carrier in combat. On 9 January, as the landings proceeded, Marcus Island assisted in providing close air support, sinking two small Japanese coastal on the north shore of Luzon. As a result of casualties, on 10 January, the screening escort carriers were reconstituted into Task Unit 77.4.6, the Close Covering Carrier Group.

On 17 January, Marcus Island, along with the rest of Task Group 77.4, retired from the waters off of Luzon, joining Rear Admiral Russell S. Berkey's Close Covering Group, stationed west of northern Mindoro. On 29 January, she supported unopposed landings at Zambales in Luzon, before heading to Ulithi in the Caroline Islands, arriving on 5 February. En route, Captain Howard Vaniman Hopkins took over command of the vessel. On 6 February, Rear Admiral Sample left Marcus Island, and she embarked Rear Admiral Felix Stump, commander of Carrier Division 24. At Ulithi, she unloaded VC-21 and took on Composite Squadron (VC) 87 on 14 February. She spent the rest of February conducting training, before heading for Leyte Gulf in early March to conduct rehearsals for Operation Iceberg, the planned landings on Okinawa.

Battle of Okinawa

Marcus Island departed Ulithi on 21 March, as the flagship for Task Unit 52.1.2. She arrived south of Kerama Retto on 26 March, where she commenced air operations. On 5 April, Composite Observation Squadron (VOC) 1, which had previously been operating onboard Wake Island was embarked by Marcus Island. In turn, she exchanged her aircraft contingent to Wake Island, which had been damaged by a kamikaze, to be ferried back to Guam.

During the Battle of Okinawa, planes of her air contingent had flown 1,085 sorties, shooting down 11 Japanese aircraft and destroying another 13 grounded aircraft. She took on a load of damaged aircraft at Guam, steaming on 5 May for the West Coast, arriving back at San Diego on 22 May. She sailed westwards again on 10 July, ferrying troops and replacement aircraft to Pearl Harbor and Guam. She returned to Naval Air Station Alameda on 15 August, the same day that the Surrender of Japan was announced.

Postwar
At Alameda, Marcus Island was assigned to the Operation Magic Carpet fleet, which repatriated U.S. servicemen from throughout the Pacific. Her first Magic Carpet trip went to Okinawa, making stops at Pearl Harbor and Guam, arriving in San Francisco on 24 October. For the rest of 1945, she conducted more Magic Carpet runs to Guam and Pearl Harbor.

Marcus Island left San Diego on 12 January 1946, transiting the Panama Canal and stopping at Norfolk, before arriving in Boston Harbor on 2 February. On 12 December, she was decommissioned and mothballed, joining the Boston group of the Atlantic Reserve Fleet, mooring at the South Boston Naval Annex. On 12 June 1955, she was redesignated as a helicopter aircraft carrier, receiving the hull symbol CVHE-77. On 7 May 1959, she was further redesignated as an aviation transport, receiving the hull symbol AKV-27. She was struck from the Navy list on 1 September 1959, and she was sold for scrapping on 29 February 1960 to Comarket Inc. She was ultimately broken up in Japan during June 1960. Marcus Island received four battle stars for her World War II service.

References

Sources

Online sources

Bibliography

External links 

 
 

Casablanca-class escort carriers
World War II escort aircraft carriers of the United States
Ships built in Vancouver, Washington
1944 ships
S4-S2-BB3 ships